Jorge Alberto Uribe Echavarría (born 30 October 1940 in Medellín) is a Colombian politician and businessman. In 2003 the government of President Alvaro Uribe appointed him as Minister of Defense of Colombia.

Biography 

He was educated at primary and secondary schools in Colombia, with two years spent at Culver Military Academy in the United States. He completed a first degree in economics at George Washington University in the US and did post-graduate work in international marketing at Besançon University in France.

He served as his country's minister of defense, succeeding Marta Lucía Ramírez, who was Colombia's first female defence minister. Prior to that appointment, he served as Finland's honorary consul in Bogotá for a period of ten years.

Jorge Alberto Uribe Echavarría is not related to fellow  medellinense President Álvaro Uribe Vélez, but the two are old friends.

Controversy 

Jorge Alberto Uribe, rejected the accusations that the newspaper El Nuevo Herald of Miami made about the alleged affair he had with a woman arrested for drug trafficking in El Buen Pastor prison in Medellin. In a press release, the Minister confirmed that he had known this person for ten years and was aware of the alleged criminal activities the woman had been accused with. "In a single opportunity, in early 2003, seven months before my office as Minister of Defense, I visited said person at the Good Shepherd Jail Medellin.

References

1940 births
Living people
Colombian businesspeople
Colombian Ministers of Defense
Columbian College of Arts and Sciences alumni
People from Antioquia Department
Culver Academies alumni
George Washington University alumni
Colombian expatriates in the United States
Colombian expatriates in France